The Tale of Orpheus and Erudices his Quene is a poem by the Scottish northern renaissance poet Robert Henryson that adapts and develops the Greek myth which most famously appears in two classic Latin texts, the Metamorphoses of Ovid and the Georgics of Virgil.

Works by Robert Henryson
Tale of Orpheus and Erudices his Quene, The
Tale of Orpheus and Erudices his Quene, The
15th-century poems
1480 works
1480 in Scotland
Orpheus
Poetry based on Metamorphoses